Mark Knowles and Roger Smith were the defending champions but lost in the quarterfinals to Ctislav Doseděl and Ján Krošlák.

Max Mirnyi and Kevin Ullyett won in the final 7–6, 6–7, 7–5 against Tomas Nydahl and Stefano Pescosolido.

Seeds
Champion seeds are indicated in bold text while text in italics indicates the round in which those seeds were eliminated.

 Mark Knowles /  Roger Smith (quarterfinals)
 David Ekerot /  Jeff Tarango (quarterfinals)
 Mahesh Bhupathi /  Leander Paes (quarterfinals)
 Bill Behrens /  Brian MacPhie (quarterfinals)

Draw

External links
 ATP draw

Kingfisher Airlines Tennis Open
1997 ATP Tour